Samjhana ( is a 1983 love story directed by Shambhu Pradhan. It starred the first golden couple of Nepali cinema, Bhuwan K.C. and Tripti Nadakar. The film was a major hit at the box office. The music of the film, composed by Ranjit Gazmer, became very popular. Binod Pradhan was the cinematographer of the film.

Film
Tripti plays both the wife and daughter of Bhuwan in the film. The film depicts the lives of people in the tea gardens of Darjeeling, India, a large part being shot at Samsing Tea Gardens, West Bengal, India. The movie marked the debut of actress Tripti Nadakar in the Nepali film industry.

Cast 
 Bhuwan K.C. 
 Tripti Nadakar
 Shishir Amgai

Soundtrack
Music soundtracks of Samjhana are:

References

Nepalese romantic drama films
Nepali-language films
1983 films
Films scored by Ranjit Gazmer